is a 1997 Japanese film directed by Takashi Miike, completely set and filmed in Taipei, Taiwan. Although the movie contains a fair amount of controversial material, the overall theme of the movie concerns the unlikely relationships formed between a hitman and his girlfriend / hooker and son.

This movie is the second part of the Black Society trilogy.

Plot
The film begins with the main character, Yujiro (Yuji), being fired from his yakuza syndicate. Soon he finds work for another boss solely as a pay-per-hit assassin, killing members of other syndicates. His life starts to become more complicated when an ex-girlfriend drops his son off at his house. His son, Ah-Chen, who is mute, begins to follow him, where the boy watches him shoot a man who is having lunch with his wife and infant son. Afterward, the boy follows Yuji to a whorehouse where he waits outside. While waiting, he eats food from the garbage and befriends a puppy who is chained in the alley.

A prostitute (Lily) and Yuji develop a live-in relationship (possibly by contract with her procurer). Things get much more complicated when the brother of Yuuji's recent victim, a lawyer, approaches his brother's yakuza syndicate to request heading the revenge attack on Yuji. Circumstances revolving around one of his contract killings force the three of them to flee, taking temporary refuge on a beach. While there, Lily teaches Yuji's son to read and write his name, 'Chen'. The mark's brother discovers the relationship between Lily and Yuji and augments her website to offer a reward for anyone with information about her. Yuuji, his son, and Lily are on the way out of town when Yuuji calls his new boss to get a passport.

Yuji's new boss knows about the reward and calls the mark's brother, despite the fact that he hired Yuji. Yuji can tell by the sound of his boss's voice that he has been betrayed, so he leaves their current location and seek refuge at the apartment of one of Lilly's friends: a trans woman named Sandy. While browsing her website on her friend's computer, Lilly discovers the reward offering on her website, informs Yuuji and the two begin to wonder where her friend, Sandy, went to. They spot her outside, waiting nervously downstairs and realize she has turned them in for money.

Yuuji sends Lily and his son together to a train station and gets revenge on his boss - splitting them up; but before they can make it there they are captured by the lawyer (the mark's brother) and Lily is killed. Yuji faces off with the lawyer, but gets knocked out due to a distraction by Chen after pumping a few bullets into Yuji - which makes him appear dead. As Yuji and Chen rejoice, an old acquaintance, a low quality and comical hitman, appears and kills Yuji. After the hitman leaves, the lawyer reawakens and gives Chen a short speech, telling him if he wanted to seek revenge in the future, that he will be waiting.

Cast

Release
The film was released on 28 June 1997.

Reception
Sight & Sound described the film as a "relatively subdued effort" from Miike, whose plot was "Stretched somewhat thin over 95 minutes". The review noted "moments of melancholy lyricism, but Miike is rigorously unsentimental in his approach to the father/son relationship - which barely figures until the closing scenes."

Notes

External links 
 

1990s Japanese-language films
1997 films
Yakuza films
Films directed by Takashi Miike
Films set in Taipei
Triad films
1990s Japanese films
1990s Hong Kong films